Love Me If You Dare may refer to:

Love Me If You Dare (film), 2003 French-Belgian film
Love Me If You Dare (TV series), 2015 Chinese TV series